Hilton Valencia (Torre Hilton, Hotel Hilton in Valencia) is a skyscraper and hotel in Valencia, Spain. Completed in 2006, has 35 floors and rises 117 metres. It was part of Hilton Hotels.

While the building is still standing and continued to be used as offices in part. It is no longer a Hilton Hotel after being taken over and renamed Hotel Melia Valencia 

It`s the highest skyscraper in Valencia in Spain.

See also 

 List of tallest buildings in Valencia

References 

Skyscrapers in Valencia
Hotels in Spain
Skyscraper hotels in Spain
Buildings and structures completed in 2006
Valencia
Hotels established in 2006
Hotel buildings completed in 2006